Phrynocephalus roborowskii, Roborowski's toadhead agama, is a species of agamid lizard found in China.

References

roborowskii
Reptiles described in 1906
Taxa named by Jacques von Bedriaga